Shane Bradley might refer to:

Shanne Bradley, English musician
Shayne Bradley, English footballer